B.F. Deal was a record label created by Austin, Texas songwriter Michael Williams in the mid-seventies. It was an independent label which produced several local Austin artists at the time including Nanci Griffith's début album, There's a Light Beyond These Woods released January 3, 1978.

Mike Williams also produced albums for Allen Damron, Austin Texas musician and Kerrville Folk Festival aficionado.

B.F. Deal Publishing also produced a limited edition book titled Texas Genesis (1978). It was about the Texas progressive country music scene from 1963 through 1978.  It was dictated into a tape recorder by Travis Holland and compiled by Michael Williams. Travis Holland was a musician that played with many, if not most, Texas progressive country artists during that time.

Selected recordings
 Mike Williams, The Radio Show BFD1 1976
 Allen Wayne Damron, The Old Campaigner BFD2 1976
 Ladd, Lady Up The Stairs BFD3 1976
 B.F. Deal Sampler Vol. 1, BFD5 1977 included Nanci Griffith, John Garza, Frank Zigal and Will Walker.
 Mike Williams, Free Man Happy Man BFD6 1977
 Bill and Bonnie Hearne, Smilin' BFD7 1977
 Nanci Griffith, There's a Light Beyond These Woods BFD9 1978
 Tim Henderson, Waitin' For The Naked Girl To Call BFD8 1978
 Mike Williams, Comin' Atcha! BFD12 1979

References

External links
Homepage: bfdealsampler.com (archived)
Mike Williams: Musician, Producer, Founder of BF Deal Records, bfdealsampler.com (archived)
 B.F. Deal, discogs.com

American independent record labels
Culture of Austin, Texas
Companies based in Austin, Texas
1976 establishments in Texas